Ronald 'Ron' Reeves (born 6 December 1938) is a former Australian rules footballer who played for Collingwood in the VFL during the late 1950s and early 1960s.

Reeves was a back pocket specialist, recruited from East Melbourne. He played for Collingwood's Under-19s before breaking into the seniors and in 1958 became a regular in their defence. That year he was a member of their premiership side and also played in the club's losing Grand Finals of 1960 and 1964.

References

Holmesby, Russell and Main, Jim (2007). The Encyclopedia of AFL Footballers. 7th ed. Melbourne: Bas Publishing.

1938 births
Living people
Australian rules footballers from Victoria (Australia)
Collingwood Football Club players
Collingwood Football Club Premiership players
One-time VFL/AFL Premiership players